Rahma Hassan (born 15 December 1988) is an Egyptian actress and former model. She started her career as a model in music videos as well as some commercials. Her first role in 2009, followed by breakthrough role as a co-star in Al Alamy with Youssef El Sherif. From there, she went on to star in Samir we Shahir we Bahir in 2010, then in multiple drama series like Azmet Sokkar (Sokkar's Crisis), Al Da'eya (The Preacher), and Moga Harra (Heat Wave) in 2013.

Modelling and Advertising
Rahma Hassan started her career as a model with Nadeem Nour in his video clips "El Leila Bs" and "ya allah Sho Moshta2lak" in 2008. Then, she started to act in a McDonald's advertisement ("Fastest Delivery - Kitchen") in 2009  and in the Mobinil advertisement ("A7san Nas - El Magmo3a "Mobinil").

Acting
Rahma Hassan started her  in "El 3alamy" (film with Youssef El Sherif). After that, she started her first TV series "Azmet Sokar" with Ahmed 3eeid, where she acted as "Sherwet", a stubborn girl learning how to take decisions without being interested in any one and rejects the tutelage of her cousin, "Sokar" (Ahmad Eid) on her behavior after the death of her father, even to deceive, and discovered that in the end, must be in control of her actions.

Rahma considered the role of "Sherawet" a blunt message to every liberal girl, saying that she saw several models similar to Sherwet in her friends, and saw how the live stages of the storm. Because of travel and family, lack of command, and saw the disaster they have suffered because of the lack of family advice monitors. This all large and small for near and how the girl is a victim of people trying to exploit her presence alone without a guardian, the reins which govern her affairs.

She also said that she had suffered in the portrayal of Sherawet, made through the series "The crisis of sugar" because her character really strayed away from the personality of Sherwet the liberal, who refuses to accept advice and goes behind the decisions that were exposed to many problems and led in the end to disaster. Instead, in fact, she required most of the time in study and became absorbed in reading books in various fields.

After her big success in TV series Azmet Sokar, Rahma acted in her film "Samir and Shahir and Bahir" as Shahir's mother. This film has made the highest revenue in Egypt in 2010, which made Rahma a big movie star in Egypt.

Filmography

References

Egyptian television actresses
Egyptian film actresses
Living people
1988 births
Egyptian female models
Actresses from Cairo